Micythus is a genus of Southeast Asian ground spiders that was first described by Tamerlan Thorell in 1897. , it contains only three species: M. anopsis, M. pictus, and M. rangunensis.

References

Araneomorphae genera
Gnaphosidae
Taxa named by Tamerlan Thorell